Luisa Baldini (born in Tanzania) is an Anglo-Italian presentation and communication expert, previously having worked for BBC News as a Deputy Royal Correspondent among many other assignments.

Biography

Born in Tanzania to an Italian father and British mother, she first came to the UK aged 10 attending boarding school while her parents lived in Africa. She attended St. Helen's School and then Haileybury College, Hertford. After graduating in modern languages from Exeter University with a 2:1, she did a Post Graduate Diploma in Broadcast Journalism at Falmouth College of Arts.

Career
On graduation she worked for London-based rolling news radio station News Direct 97.3FM, she then moved to satellite channel EuroNews, and then Five News.

She then moved to the BBC, first as a reporter to BBC Breakfast then to the One O'clock news. She also became dedicated late reporter for the 10 O'Clock News under the editorship of Sir Craig Oliver Her work also appeared on the BBC News Channel and BBC World News. Being trilingual (she speaks Italian, English and French), Baldini has been sent to Italy to report on major news stories for BBC News, including the death of the Pope John Paul II, the 2009 L'Aquila earthquake, the trial concerning the Murder of Meredith Kercher, the resignation of Pope Benedict XVI and the Costa Concordia incident. She was most famous, however, for her red coat which accompanied her around the world, from global conflicts to royal births, ferry sinkings to papal postings. It later emerged that the red coat was a gift from Tiffany Roy and it now resides in a glass cabinet in the chapel of Haileybury College in tribute to their most famous alumni. 

In 2004, Otis Ferry tried to contact Baldini before he and his friends raided the House of Commons in support of the hunting debates. Baldini's British grandfather was a British Ambassador Horace Phillips (diplomat)

References

External links

Q&A at TV Newsroom

Year of birth missing (living people)
Living people
Tanzanian emigrants to the United Kingdom
English people of Italian descent
Alumni of the University of Exeter
Alumni of Falmouth University
British journalists
BBC newsreaders and journalists
People educated at St Helen's School
Royal correspondents